Kitchen (キッチン) is a novel written by Japanese author Banana Yoshimoto (吉本ばなな）in 1988 and translated into English in 1993 by Megan Backus.

Although one may notice a certain Western influence in Yoshimoto's style, Kitchen is still critically recognized as an example of contemporary Japanese literature; The Independent, The Times, and The New Yorker have all reviewed the novel favorably.

Most editions also include a novella entitled Moonlight Shadow, which is also a tragedy dealing with loss and love.

There have been two films made of the story, a Japanese movie in 1989 and a more widely released version produced in Hong Kong by Yim Ho in 1997.

Characters
 Mikage Sakurai — Young Japanese woman. Main character. Struggling with the loss of her grandmother, who was her last surviving relative. She moves in with Yuichi Tanabe and Eriko Tanabe after her grandmother's death.
Yuichi Tanabe —  Son of Eriko Tanabe. Main character. His mother died of cancer when Yuichi was a very young child. He lives with his loving transgender mother and supports Mikage in her time of grieving. He eventually loses his mother, and relies on emotional support from Mikage.
Eriko Tanabe — Supporting character. Transgender woman. Eriko owns a nightclub, which is where she is killed by a man who feels as though she is tricking him by being a transgender woman. She is described as a very beautiful and kind woman.
Sotaro — Mikage's Ex Boyfriend. Broke up the Mikage's grandmother became ill and that he was hard to keep up with. 
Okuno — A girl who is obsessive over Yuichi and dislikes Mikage.
Chika—A loyal employee who inherited the gay nightclub from Eriko and helps the relationship between Mikage and Yuichi.
Mikage's Grandmother —A sweet lady who passed away and raised Mikage.

Plot

From Mikage's love of kitchens to her job as a culinary teacher's assistant to the multiple scenes in which food is merely present, Kitchen is a short window into the life of a young Japanese woman and her discoveries about food and love amongst a background of tragedy.

In Kitchen, a young Japanese woman named Mikage Sakurai struggles to overcome the death of her grandmother. She gradually grows close to one of her grandmother's friends, Yuichi, from a flower shop and ends up staying with him and his transgender mother, Eriko. During her stay, she develops affection for Yuichi and Eriko, almost becoming part of their family. However, she moves out after six months as she finds a new job as a culinary teacher's assistant. When she finds that Eriko was murdered, she tries to support Yuichi through the difficult time, and realises that Yuichi is probably in love with her. Reluctant to face her own feelings for him, she goes away to Izu for a work assignment, while Yuichi stays in a guest-house. However, after going to a restaurant to eat katsudon, she realises she wants to bring it to Yuichi. She goes to Yuichi’s guest-house and sneaks inside his room in the middle of the night to bring him katsudon. There Mikage tells him she doesn’t want to lose him and proposes to build a new life together.

In Moonlight Shadow, a woman named Satsuki loses her boyfriend Hitoshi in an accident and tells us: "The night he died my soul went away to some other place and I couldn't bring it back". She becomes friendly with his brother Hiiragi, whose girlfriend died in the same crash. On one insomniac night out walking she meets a strange woman called Urara who has also lost someone. Urara introduces her to the mystical experience of The Weaver Festival Phenomenon, which she hopes will cauterize their collective grief.

Book Summary 
A young woman, Mikage, has lost her grandmother whom she had lived with. She describes the difficulty of the deaths of her family members and how the kitchen was always a place of comfort in these situations. Mikage is left with her grandmothers apartment, which was too expensive just for her. Mikage is later invited to dinner by Yuichi Tanabe, a man who worked at a flower shop where her grandmother visited and who had helped at her funeral.

When Mikage arrives at Yuichi Tanabe's house, she first notices the kitchen, how it was bare and looked "out of a commercial". As they wait for Tanabe's mother to arrive from work, Mikage explores the kitchen, a traditional kitchen with used appliances and kitchen ware. Yuichi talks about how he invited Mikage over to help her through a hard time and his relationship with her grandmother. Eriko, Yuichi's mother returns from work and meets Mikage. Eriko is a beautiful woman who we learn was a man. We learn her name was Yuji and we learn about how she was married to Yuchi's mother who passed when he was young. Eriko was taken in by her and how the marriage may have been a sign of gratitude. 

Later, Eriko asks Mikage to live with them, which she accepts. The apartment her grandmother left was too expensive for her to continue living in. The rent was free in exchange for soupy rice, and the stress of living with an elderly person was lifted. Mikage's ex, Sotaro, calls and informs her that Yuichi's girlfriend slapped him due to her living with him. 

While sleeping on the sofa, Mikage has a dream about Yuichi being a princess and talks about how he wants ramen. In the morning, Yuichi also talks about the dream and they realize they had the same dream and the same kitchen. 

Mikage moves out and works as an assistant at a culinary school. While away, Yuichi calls and informs her that Eriko had been murdered at her nightclub. She was stabbed by a man who found out she was transgender. During the stabbing, Eriko was able to beat the man with a barbell and was able to kill him defence. Due to this, Mikage and Yuichi have a meal together and make treats. While drunk, Yuichi asks for her to move back in, which she doesn't answer because she can't decide to love him or be his friend. In the morning, Mikage gets a call but the caller doesn't answer. She continues to wake up and go to work. At work, Okuno, Yuichi's ex tells her to stay away from him. 

In efforts to decide what to do, Mikage decides to go on a business trip. Before this however, Chika, an old friend of Eriko invites her to lunch. They talk about the situation between her and Yuichi and Chika informs her that Yuichi left Tokyo to address his feelings and gives Mikage his contact info for the inn. She calls and they both complain about the food. While at a katsudon restaurant, she decides it is so delicious she needs to bring it to Yuichi. She delivers it to him and they talk about how he is struggling with depression and she says how they would be happy together if he wanted to form a relationship. The last day of her trip, Yuichi calls to inform that he is returning to Tokyo and is excited to pick her up.

Awards
 6th Kaien Newcomer Writers Prize – November 1987
 16th Izumi Kyoka Literary Prize - October 1988
 39th Minister of Education's Art Encouragement Prize for New Artists  – August 1988 ((this prize was awarded for Kitchen as well as two other novellas by Yoshimoto: Utakata and Sanctuary)

Book information 
Kitchen (English edition) by Banana Yoshimoto
Hardcover –  published by Grove Press
Paperback –  published by Washington Square Press

References

External links
 New York Times review
 
 

1988 Japanese novels
Japanese novels adapted into films
Novels by Banana Yoshimoto
Novels set in Japan
Novels with transgender themes
1980s LGBT novels
Japanese LGBT novels
1988 debut novels
Grove Press books